Bill Johnston was a key member of Donald Bradman's famous Australian cricket team, which toured England in 1948. The Australians went undefeated in their 34 matches during the English summer; this unprecedented feat by a Test side touring England earned them the sobriquet The Invincibles.

Johnston was a left-arm bowler who engaged in fast bowling when the ball was new and conducive to pacemen, before reverting to orthodox spin when the ball became old. He was Australia's third fast bowler in the Tests, reinforcing the new ball attack of Keith Miller and Ray Lindwall, who were regarded as one of the finest pace pairings of all time. Bradman typically used Miller and Lindwall in short bursts against the English batsmen with the new ball. The hosts had agreed to make a new ball available every 55 overs, more frequently than usual. This allowed the Australian pacemen more frequent use of a shiny ball that swung at high pace. Johnston typically delivered pace after the Lindwall and Miller had first use of the new ball, before resorting to spin later in the innings. In order to keep Lindwall and Miller fresh, Bradman had Johnston deliver the most overs by any bowler.

Johnston was the equal-leading wicket-taker in the Tests (27 along with Lindwall) and Australia's most prolific wicket-taker in the first-class matches with 102. The latter feat made him the last Australian to take a century of wickets on an Ashes tour. In recognition of his achievements, Johnston was chosen as one of the five Wisden Cricketers of the Year. Wisden said "no Australian made a greater personal contribution to the playing success of the 1948 side".

Background 
During the Australian summer of 1947–48, Johnston played in four of the five Tests against India. He was a major part in Australia's 4–0 series win; the second highest wicket-taker with 16 scalps, Johnston had the best bowling average of 11.37. Ray Lindwall led the wicket-takers with 18. As a result, Johnston was selected for the 1948 tour of England. During the trip, Johnston roomed with Doug Ring who was a teammate in the Richmond and Victorian cricket teams. As Ring was a leg spinner, he and Johnston were in direct competition for a place in the playing XI.

Early tour 
Australia traditionally fielded its first-choice team in the tour opener, which was customarily against Worcestershire. When Johnston was omitted for the opening match, it appeared he would not be in Bradman's Test plans. Australia went on to win by an innings, setting the tone for their tour.

Bradman brought Johnston into the team for the second tour match against Leicestershire. He made 12 runs and was the last man out as Australia ended on 448. After a lower order collapse of 5/38 against the local spin attack, Johnston came in and put on 37 in partnership with Keith Miller, allowing his colleague to reach his double century. Johnston bowled six wicketless overs for 15 as the hosts fell for 130. Made to follow on, Leicestershire made 147 to lose by an innings. Johnston took his first wicket of the tour, trapping Jack Walsh leg before wicket (lbw) to end with 1/42 from 27 overs. Johnston played a leading role in Australia's victory in the next match, against Yorkshire, on a damp pitch favourable to slower bowling. In this match, Johnston resorted to bowling left arm orthodox spin. The hosts elected to bat and he bowled almost unchanged, sending down 26 of the 54.3 overs, 14 of which were maidens. He took 4/18 as Yorkshire were bowled out in difficult batting conditions for 71. His wickets included batsmen Alec Coxon and Willie Watson, who went on to become England Test cricketers. The match remained finely balanced after Australia made 101, with Johnston unbeaten on five. He was again miserly in the second innings, bowling 15.2 overs with seven maidens and taking 6/18. His victims included leading English batsman Len Hutton, and Coxon and Watson for the second time as the hosts were bowled out for 89. Johnston had ended the match with 10/40. After collapsing to 6/31—effectively seven wickets down as Sam Loxton was injured and unable to bat—Australia scraped home by four wickets. It was the closest Australia would come to defeat for the whole tour.

The tourists travelled to London to play Surrey at The Oval, and they amassed 632 after batting first. Johnston bowled without success in the first innings. In the second innings he claimed both openers to reduce the hosts to 2/11 after Bradman had forced them to follow on. He returned later in the innings to remove Alec Bedser and Jim Laker, ending with 4/40 as Surrey were defeated by an innings. Johnston was rested for the following match against Cambridge University, which Australia won by an innings.

Johnston returned as Australia crushed Essex by an innings and 451 runs, their largest winning margin for the summer. After setting a world record for the most number of first-class runs in one day’s play (721), of which Johnston contributed nine, Bradman’s men bowled Essex out for 83 and 187 after enforcing the follow on. Johnston managed a match total of only 1/36. This was followed by another innings victory, this time over Oxford University. After scoring 13 in Australia's 431, Johnston bowled the most overs by an Australian in the match, taking 2/40 and 2/44 across a total of 42 overs.

Johnston was the left out for the next fixture, which was against the Marylebone Cricket Club (MCC) at Lord's. The MCC fielded seven players who would represent England in the Tests, and were basically a full strength Test team, while Australia fielded their first-choice team, with Johnston omitted. It was a chance for the Australian bowlers to gain a psychological advantage, with Len Hutton, Denis Compton and Bill Edrich—three of England's first four batsmen—all playing. Australia won by an innings to give an indication of their strength.

Four county matches remained before the Tests, giving the players more chances to press their claims for selection. Johnston was recalled for Australia'a first non-victory of the tour, which was against Lancashire. After the first day was washed out, Johnston made 24 in a 25-run ninth-wicket partnership with wicket-keeper Ron Saggers, which took Australia from 8/170 to 9/195. The tourists were eventually bowled out for 204. During his innings, Johnston swung lustily and hit three sixes. In reply, Lancashire reached 4/144 before Johnston took five of the last six wickets to help dismiss the home side for 182, securing a slender lead for the tourists. Johnston ended with 5/49 from 29 overs, the most by any of the Australians, and was not required to bat in the second innings.

Johnston was rested for the subsequent match against Nottinghamshire at Trent Bridge, which was drawn. He returned against Hampshire and played a major role in Australia's eight-wicket win. The home team were put into bat on a drying pitch by vice-captain Lindsay Hassett—Bradman had rested himself for the match. Johnston bowled for almost the whole innings, sending down 38.4 of 85.4 overs. He took wickets at regular intervals to end with 6/74 as Hampshire were bowled out for 195. Johnston was unbeaten on two as Australia lost 8/47 and collapsed to 117 all out, trailing by 78 runs. It was the first time that the tourists had conceded a first innings lead for the season. In the second innings, Johnston bowled unchanged at his end for the entire innings, providing steady breakthroughs to end with 5/43 as Hampshire were bowled out for 103. This left Australia a target of 182, and they batted fluently in their second innings to win by eight wickets. Johnston ended with match figures of 11/117. He was rested in the innings win over Sussex, in the last fixture before the First Test.

First Test 

Johnston was not in Bradman's planned Test team. However, the Australian skipper changed his mind on the morning of the First Test in Trent Bridge when rain was forecast. Johnston was played in the hope of exploiting a wet wicket. Johnston had taken 10/40 against Yorkshire and 11/117 against Hampshire on similar surfaces. He showed his credentials by taking a match total of 9/183 from 84 overs to help Australia to grind out a victory by eight wickets. England elected to bat first and after strike bowler Ray Lindwall broke down on the first day, the burden on Johnston grew.

England had reached 2/46 when Johnston was brought into the attack for his first over. He bowled Bill Edrich, knocking out the off stump while the batsman was on the front foot. Two balls later, Johnston removed Joe Hardstaff junior without scoring, caught by Miller in slips after attempting a cut shot; the catch was described by Wisden as "dazzling". Miller dived and balanced himself on his spine before catching the ball to leave England at 4/46. Journalist and former Australian Test leg spinner Bill O'Reilly said: "Johnston had trimmed and embroidered the efforts of his opening bowlers and had swung the fortunes of the game completely in Australia's favour".

Johnston then knocked over Charlie Barnett's stumps as the batsman leaned onto the front foot and inside edged the ball into his stumps for eight; this brought Godfrey Evans—who was given two lives—to the crease at 6/60. Evans hit Johnston hard in the air to cover, where the ball went through Bradman for a boundary. The second catching opportunity went in the same direction before traveling through Bradman's hand and striking him in the abdomen. However, Johnston eventually snared Evans, who hit a ball strongly, but straight to short leg where Arthur Morris took the catch close in, as England reached 8/74.

However, a rearguard action took England to a total of 165, before Johnston removed Alec Bedser to end the innings. Johnston finished with 5/36, in a display characterised by his accuracy and variations in pace and swing. When Australia batted, Johnston and Ernie Toshack wagged a last-wicket partnership of 33 runs in only 18 minutes. They played in a free-wheeling manner before Bedser trapped Toshack lbw to end the home team’s innings on 509, leaving the tourists with a 344-run lead and Johnston unbeaten on 17.

Johnston took the new ball with Miller and delivered 59 overs in the second innings to take 4/147 in Lindwall's absence. Johnston bowled without success in the first half of the innings; the closest he came to a wicket on the third afternoon when Len Hutton and Denis Compton were putting on a century partnership was when Compton aimed an uppish square drive from Johnston that flew in the air wide of cover point. On the fourth day, England continued to make steady progress and Johnston was unsuccessful although he was able to make the ball move sideways in the morning under cloudy conditions. He was then attacked by Hardstaff, who drove several fours through the off side and forced Bradman to remove Johnston. He returned to remove Barnett and English captain Norman Yardley late on the fourth day as the hosts’ neared 300. Barnett was caught by Miller in the slips and Johnston took a return catch to remove the English skipper. Johnston bowled 30 overs, the most of any bowler for the day, as England reached the penultimate evening on 345/6, a lead of one run. The next morning, Johnston removed Evans and bowled Jack Young to end England's innings at 441 on the final day. Johnston bowled the most overs of any player and was the leading wicket-taker for the match as Australia took a 1–0 lead—the Australian batsmen reached the target of 98 with eight wickets in hand.

After the First Test, Johnston was the leading wicket-taker as Australia completed an innings victory over Northamptonshire. He took 3/25 in the first innings, before dismissing the home side's top four batsmen in the second innings to reduce them to 4/108; they were eventually bowled out for 169. Johnston ended with 4/49. This was followed by a drawn match against Yorkshire, in which Johnston scored an unbeaten 15, before bowling almost unchanged in the home side's first innings. Johnston bowled 41.1 out of 90.1 overs and ended with 3/101, including the wickets of Test players Alec Coxon and Watson. The match ended in a draw. Johnston bowled three overs for 15 in the second innings; Bradman chose not to push for a win and declared late in the second innings so that his bowlers would not have to exert themselves to any significant extent before the next Test.

Second Test 

In the Second Test at Lord's, Australia batted first and Johnston scored his Test career best of 29 in another tail-wagging performance in the first innings. After coming to the crease with the score at 8/275 on the second morning, Johnston added 45 runs with wicket-keeper Don Tallon before the latter fell to Bedser. He was joined by last man Toshack and they put on 30 before Johnston was stumped—having overbalanced while leaning onto the front foot and trying to hit a ball for six—from the bowling of Doug Wright to end Australia's innings at 350. Both Johnston and Toshack threw the bat at the ball, which often went in vastly different directions compared to where they had aimed their shots. Both men—not known for their batting ability—played without inhibitions, joyfully revelling in their luck. One sequence of two overs from Edrich was taken for 28 runs, with many balls being unintentionally spooned over the slips or the covers.

With Keith Miller injured and playing purely as a batsman, Johnston took the new ball, sharing it with Lindwall. He was unable to take a wicket initially, but the English openers were uncomfortable when he and Lindwall were taking the new ball. Following the tea break, he returned with the second new ball after Compton and Yardley had put on an 87-run partnership to stabilise the middle-order. Johnston took Compton's outside edge and Miller completed the catch in slips. The left armer then claimed Evans, caught by a diving Miller after the Englishman had taken a swing of the bat wide outside off stump; this left the hosts at 7/145. Johnston ended with 2/43 from 22 overs as England were bowled for at 215 early on the third morning. After Australia declared at 7/460 on the fourth afternoon to leave the home side a target of 596, Johnston troubled the English openers with the new ball, but did not take a wicket.

Lindwall and Johnston extracted steep bounce with the new ball, troubling the English batsmen. Fielding in the slips, Lindwall dropped Hutton from Johnston's bowling before the English batsman had scored. Johnston usually moved the ball into the right-handed batsmen, but on this occasion the ball went straight on and took the outside of the edge of Hutton's bat. Hutton had trouble with both Australian pacemen, and played and missed multiple times in the deteriorating light. In a fidgety display, he played loosely outside the off stump and missed four times in one Johnston over, before Lindwall dismissed him.

Yardley’s men resumed at 3/106 on the final day. On the second ball of the final morning, bowled by Johnston, Compton aimed a square drive, but the delivery was Johnston's variation ball, which went away instead of into the batsman. The ball flew off the outside edge to a diving Miller, who knocked the ball up before falling on his back and completing the catch as the ball came down. Compton stood his ground and waited for the umpire to confirm whether Miller had caught the ball cleanly, and was duly given out by the unhesitating official. O'Reilly described Miller's effort as "perhaps the very best slips catch of the whole series and … a real match-winner." Johnston then removed Bedser for nine to end with 2/62 as Australia won by 409 runs and took a 2–0 series lead.

After 16 days of cricket in 20 days, from the First to the Second Test, Johnston was rested from the next two matches against Surrey and Gloucestershire, which Australia won by ten wickets and an innings respectively.

Third Test 

Johnston returned for the Third Test at Old Trafford, where the home team elected to bat first. In an effective containing performance, Johnston took 3/67 from 45.5 overs in the first innings. England had looked assured in the first hour, before Johnston—again taking the new ball with Lindwall—bowled Cyril Washbrook with a yorker to leave England at 1/22. Johnston had been bowling from over the wicket, and his left-arm deliveries had generally been swinging back into the right-handed Washbrook. However, the opening batsman did not detect Johnston’s variation ball, which was released from wide of the crease and angled across more sharply without curling back in. Washbrook played inside the line of the ball, which hit his stumps. Australia nearly had two wickets in the same over as the new batsman Edrich struggled. He played loosely outside the off stump to the first ball from Johnston but did not get an edge, and on the third delivery, Edrich survived again. Receiving a ball on middle and leg stump, he tried to defend it straight back down the pitch, rather than the conventional stroke to the leg side, and managed to edge the ball past the slips for four. Johnston repeatedly hurried Edrich with his pace, forcing the batsman to make many last-moment movements to either hit the ball or withdraw from a shot during the formative stage of his innings.

Johnston returned with the second new ball after lunch to remove Tom Dollery with another yorker, leaving England at 4/97. This dismissal mirrored that of Washbrook’s in that Dollery failed to detect Johnston’s variation ball, and thus played for swing when there was none. Late in the day, Johnston took the catch as Lindwall removed Evans, who had taken a wild slash to leave England at 7/216. In the final minutes of play, Johnston extracted an edge from Compton on 64, but Tallon dropped the catch. On the second morning, Tallon dropped Compton—then on 73—for the third time, off the bowling of Johnston, who eventually ended the England innings on 363 by removing Young. Compton had added a further 81 after being dropped from Johnston's bowling to end unbeaten on 145. Johnston had bowled the most overs of the Australians and been the most economical.

In reply, Australia were in trouble at 7/208 when Johnston came to the crease to join Lindwall, with five more runs needed to avoid the follow on. As Sid Barnes was unable to bat due to injury, Australia were effectively eight wickets down. Johnston helped Lindwall advance Australia beyond the follow-on before Bedser removed both. Johnston was reprieved in his brief innings when he edged a delivery from Dick Pollard in the direction of Edrich at first slip, but Evans dived across, trying to catch the ball at full stretch in his right hand. The wicket-keeper could not hold onto the ball, and the resulting deflection further to the right wrong-footed Edrich, who was moving the other way, and it went past him. From second slip, Jack Crapp dived left behind Edrich but the ball landed a few centimetres beyond his fingers. However, in the next over Bedser, Johnston edged the ball in the same manner and Crapp caught the ball easily. Johnston was out for three as Australia ended with 221 to narrowly avoid the follow on by eight runs. He was wicketless in the second innings, taking 0/34 as England declared at 3/174 and set Australia 317 for victory on the last day after the fourth day was completely washed out by rain. The match ended in a draw with Australia at 1/92, after many rain interruptions.

Johnston played in Australia's only match before the Fourth Test, which was against Middlesex. He dismissed Jack Robertson, Edrich and John Dewes to leave the hosts at 4/92 and ended with 3/43 as they were bowled out for 203. In the second innings, he took two early wicket—including Compton—to reduce the hosts to 3/27 before ending with 2/28 as Australia bowled Middlesex out for 135. Bradman’s men went on to win by ten wickets.

Fourth Test 

In the Fourth Test at Headingley, England batted first on a pitch regarded as being ideal for strokeplay, and Australia's bowlers had little success on the first day. Early in the day, Johnston appeared to be having back problems. He had bowled the most overs of any bowler on the tour and his loss would have meant a heavy workload for his remaining colleagues. His apparent discomfort led onlookers to opine that he should have been given more rest in the county matches. After an opening partnership of 143, England consolidated to reach 1/268 in the last over of the day before Johnston removed Washbrook for 143. Johnston did not taste further success in the first innings and ended with 1/86 from 38 overs as the home team ended on 496, their highest score of the series.

In reply, Australia were still more than 100 runs behind when Johnston joined Lindwall with the score at 8/355, late on the third day. Lindwall hit out, scoring 77 in an innings marked by powerful driving and pulling, dominating the stand of 48 with Johnston, who made only 13. Johnston accompanied Lindwall for 80 minutes, before the injured Ernie Toshack survived the last 50 minutes until stumps, with Johnston running for him. Despite Toshack and Johnston’s lack of familiarity with having and acting as a runner respectively, and the resulting disorders in running between the wickets, Lindwall was able to manipulate the strike so he faced most of the balls. Johnston able to survive against the English pacemen with relative ease when he was batting, leading O’Reilly to lament the absence of leg spinner Doug Wright, whose guile and flight was held in high regard by the Australians. Lindwall was the last man out on the fourth morning with the total on 458, leaving Australia 38 runs in arrears on the first innings.

Australia lost the services of Toshack after he broke down with a knee injury in the first innings, increasing the burden on the remaining bowlers as England sought to extend their lead on the fourth day. For the second time in the match, Washbrook and Hutton put on a century opening partnership. After reaching 50, Washbrook hooked a short ball from Johnston and top edged it, but Bradman failed to take the catch. However, Washbrook soon repeated the shot from the bowling of Johnston with fatal results. The ball again went in the air, and Neil Harvey quickly ran across the ground and bent over to catch it at feet height while on the run, removing the opener for 65. Fingleton said that Harvey’s effort "was the catch of the season—or, indeed, would have been had Harvey not turned on several magnificent aerial performances down at The Oval [in the match against Surrey]". O’Reilly doubted "whether any other player on either side could have made the distance to get to the ball, let alone make a neat catch of it". He further said the "hook was a beauty and the catch was a classic".

England moved to 4/277 when a mini-collapse occurred. Yardley made seven before he was removed by Johnston, caught by a leaping Harvey while attempting a big shot. Johnston then removed Ken Cranston, caught behind for a duck to leave England at 6/278. When Johnston removed Compton for 66, caught by Miller at cover, the hosts were 7/293 with no recognised batsmen remaining, having lost 4/33. England recovered to reach 8/362 at the close of the fourth day. The next day, Yardley declared at 8/365, leaving Johnston with the pick of the bowling figures, 4/95 from 29 overs. This left the tourists a target of 404 from 345 minutes. Australia went on to break the world record Test run-chase record by scoring 3/404 to take a 3–0 lead with 15 minutes to spare.

Johnston went on to play in the match against Derbyshire immediately after the Headingley Test, taking 3/41 and 1/35 as Australia enforced the follow on and won by an innings. He was rested for the next game against Glamorgan, which ended in a rain-affected draw without reaching the second innings. Johnston returned and took 2/41 in the first innings against Warwickshire, before taking 4/32 in the second innings, including three of the last five wickets, as the hosts fell from 5/118 to 155 all out. The left armer bowled almost unchanged during the second innings, sending down 39 of the 85.5 overs, including 16 maidens. His wickets included New Zealand Test batsman Martin Donnelly and Indian and Pakistani dual international Abdul Hafeez Kardar, as Australia went on to win by nine wickets. Johnston was then rested from two consecutive matches, against Lancashire and Durham, both of which were rain-affected draws.

Fifth Test 

Johnston rounded off his Ashes series with the Fifth Test at The Oval. English skipper Norman Yardley elected to bat on a rain-affected pitch, a decision many regarded as surprising. Precipitation in the past week rendered play before midday impossible. Former Australian Test batsman and leading commentator Jack Fingleton speculated that the tourists would have bowled if they had won the toss.

The damp conditions meant required a large amount of sawdust to be laid down to help the players keep their grip. Along with the rain, the humid conditions assisted the Australian bowlers, who were able to make the ball bounce at variable heights.

After Miller removed John Dewes with the score at 1/2, Bradman made an early bowling change and introduced Johnston. Edrich joined Hutton and they played cautiously until the former attempted to hook a short ball from Johnston. Lindsay Hassett caught the ball just behind square leg, after diving sideways and getting both hands to the ball. This left England at 2/10. After the lunch break, Johnston dismissed debutant Allan Watkins without scoring after the batsman played across the line to be trapped lbw, leaving England at 6/42. Johnston ended with 2/20 from 16 overs as England were skittled for 52. After being unbeaten without scoring in Australia's innings of 389, Johnston was again among the wickets when England's second innings late on the second day.

England started their second innings with a deficit of 337 runs and reached 1/54 by the premature end of the second day due to bad light. The following morning, they made slow and steady progress as Johnston bowled his finger spin from around the wicket with a well-protected off side. The four men in the off side ring had much work to do as Hutton hit the ball there repeatedly. The English batsmen progressed and Johnston had one confident appeal for lbw against Compton, but there were few scares.

They reached 2/125 after lunch, when Compton—who was on 39—aimed a hard cut shot from Johnston's bowling, which flew off the edge into Lindwall's left hand at second slip for a "freak slip catch". This triggered a collapse late in the afternoon, which saw the hosts lose 4/25 to end the third day at 7/178. England resumed on the fourth morning with only three wickets in hand, still needing 159 runs to make Bradman’s men bat again. Johnston quickly removed the last three wickets, Alec Bedser, Yardley and Eric Hollies to seal an Australian victory by an innings and 149 runs. Only ten runs were added in the brief morning session; Hollies fell for a golden duck after skying a ball to Morris, immediately after Yardley became the ninth man to fall. Johnston ended with 4/40 from 27.3 overs and he was the most economical of the bowlers. Given the time lost to inclement weather on the first day, Australia had won the match in less than three days of playing time. Overall, Johnston finished with 27 Test wickets at an average of 23.33, equal to Lindwall but at a higher average.

Later tour matches 

Seven matches remained on Bradman's quest to go through a tour of England without defeat. Australia batted first against Kent and made 361. Johnston then took three wickets with the new ball to help reduce the hosts to 5/16, before ending with 3/10 from six overs. Forced to follow on after being bowled out for 51 in 23 overs, Kent were reduced to 4/37 by three early Lindwall wickets. Johnston ended with 1/28 as the home team capitulated for 124 and lost by an innings. The victory over Kent was followed by a match against the Gentlemen of England. Johnston was rested as Australia completed another innings victory. He returned for the match against Somerset, which resulted in a third consecutive innings win. After Australia had declared at 5/560, Johnston took the opening wicket of Harold Gimblett before returning to take the last two scalps of the first innings from consecutive balls, bowling his finger spin. He ended with 3/34 as Somerset fell for 115 and were forced to follow on. Johnston bowled the second over of the second innings. As Johnston had taken wickets with his last two balls in the first innings, his first delivery was the hat-trick ball. Gimblett negotiated the first ball safely, before being trapped lbw for a duck on the next. Johnston had thus taken three wickets in four balls. He bowled unchanged throughout the innings to end with 5/34 from 17.4 overs as Somerset were bowled out for 71. Johnston took the final wicket to fall—Horace Hazell—trapped for a duck, which brought up his 100th first-class wicket for the tour.

In the match against the South of England, Johnston took 1/63—Edrich being his only wicket—after Australia declared at 7/522. Bradman’s men dismissed the hosts for 298 and rain ended the match before the second innings could start.

Australia's biggest challenge in the post-Test tour matches was against the Leveson-Gower's XI. During the last tour in 1938, this team was effectively a full-strength England outfit, but this time Bradman insisted that only six current England Test players be allowed to represent the hosts. After his opponents had finalised their players, Bradman named a full-strength team. In a rain-interrupted match, Johnston bowled Edrich for 15. He ended with 1/20 as the hosts folded for 177. Johnston made an unbeaten 26 in a partnership of 30 with Lindsay Hassett as Australia replied with 8/489 declared. Time ran out with the Leveson-Gower's XI at 0/75 in the second innings.

The tour ended with two non-first-class matches against Scotland. In the first, Australia scored 236 before Johnston took 6/15 from 12.5 overs. He took the last four wickets as the home team fell from 6/81 to be all out for 85. Johnston bowled four wicketless overs in the second innings as Australia completed victory without needing to bat for a second time. In the second match, he signed off on his tour in a low key manner, taking a wicket in each innings to end with a match total of 2/48 as Australia completed another innings triumph.

Role 

Johnston played as a left-arm fast bowler when the ball was new and conducive to pace bowling, before reverting to finger spin when it became old and lost its shine. He was Australia's third fast bowler in the Tests, reinforcing the new ball pairing of Keith Miller and Ray Lindwall, who were regarded as one of the finest pace duos of all time. Bradman typically used Miller and Lindwall in short and sharp new ball bursts against the local batsmen. England had agreed that a new ball would be available every 55 overs, a milestone that usually came more frequently than the old regulation of 200 runs for every ball. This allowed Australia—who had the superior pace attack—more frequent use of a shiny ball, which swung at high pace. Johnston typically bowled pace after the first-choice pair had finished their new ball spell, before reverting to spin when the ball was worn. He took 27 wickets at 23.33 in the Tests, making him the equal-leading wicket-taker along with Lindwall, who averaged 19.62. The Australian pacemen’s tally was substantially more than the next best, recorded by England's Alec Bedser, who took 18 wickets at 38.22.

In both the Test and county matches during the 1948 tour, Johnston carried the heaviest workload, bowling nearly 200 overs more than any other squad member. He was the leading wicket-taker in all first-class matches with 102 wickets at 16.42, and the last Australian to take a century of wickets on a tour of England. His average was only slightly inferior to that of Lindwall, who took 86 wickets at 15.68. The roles Johnston fulfilled are borne out in his economy rate and strike rate. He was more economical than Miller and Lindwall, who took wickets more frequently.

Johnston's performances prompted Bradman to call him "Australia's greatest left-hand bowler". As a result of his ability to bowl spin and pace, teammate Neil Harvey thought the team effectively had 13 players, saying "we reckoned Bradman was worth two [batsmen] and Bill Johnston was worth two [bowlers]". Harvey rated Johnston the best team man in the squad, and Bill Brown praised Johnston's work ethic in bowling for long periods after Lindwall and Miller had been given the best opportunities with the new ball. Spin bowling teammate Ian Johnson described him as "the finest team man and tourist" in cricket and valued his personality, while Miller described him as "the most popular man in cricket". Johnston sometimes amused his colleagues by demonstrating his double jointedness, wrapping his feet around the back of his neck. He was reputed to have nearly drowned when he attempted this in the communal bath at Lord's.

After carrying a heavy workload in the early stages of the tour, Johnston was used more sparingly in the latter stages. As the tour progressed, Johnston improved his control and restrained England's batsmen between the new ball bursts of Lindwall and Miller. Johnston was chosen as one of the five Wisden Cricketers of the Year. Wisden said "no Australian made a greater personal contribution to the playing success of the 1948 side". Fingleton wrote that Australia had never sent a greater left-hander to England.

During the tour, Johnston had few opportunities with the bat, invariably batting at either No. 10 and No. 11 alongside Toshack, another tail-ender with little batting ability. Neither player ever passed 30 in their first-class career, and they were the only two Australians who failed to pass 50 during the tour. As Australia's other frontline bowlers were Miller, Lindwall, Colin McCool, Ian Johnson and Doug Ring, all of whom scored centuries and more than 20 fifties each during their first-class career, Toshack and Johnston were rooted at the bottom of the batting order. As Australia often won by an innings, and declared in the first innings many time due to their batting strength, Johnston only had 18 innings in his 21 first-class fixtures and scored 188 runs at 18.80, the third lowest average and aggregate. He scored 62 runs in the Tests at 20.66, including his highest first-class score of 29 in the Second Test at Lord’s.

Notes

Statistical note

General notes

References 
 
 
 
 
 
 

The Invincibles (cricket)